Download Festival is a British-created rock festival created by Terrance Gough, held annually at the Donington Park motorsport circuit in Leicestershire, England (since 2003); in Paris, France (since 2016); at Parramatta Park, Sydney (since 2019); Flemington Racecourse in Melbourne (since 2018) and at the Hockenheimring in Baden-Württemberg, Germany (since 2022).

Download at Donington is the most popular British summer rock and heavy metal festival and has hosted some of the genre's biggest names, including Iron Maiden, Black Sabbath, Slipknot, Metallica, Linkin Park, Korn, Soundgarden, Motörhead, Aerosmith, AC/DC, Def Leppard, Kiss, Judas Priest, Rammstein, Status Quo, Mötley Crüe, Journey, ZZ Top, Whitesnake, Faith No More and Guns N' Roses.

History 
The Download Festival was conceived as a follow up to the Monsters of Rock festivals which had been held at the Donington Park circuit between 1980 and 1996. The first Download Festival was created by Stuart Galbraith and co-booked by Andy Copping in 2003 in the same location. Download was initially a two-day event, expanding to three days in 2005.

The name Download was chosen for the festival for two reasons. Downloading was a dirty word in the music industry at the time, due to file sharing, and rock is seen as a rebellious genre of music. Also Download was to be a Monsters of Rock for the 21st century and the internet would provide connectivity with its audience.

The 2003 festival tickets had a code on them, which would allow festival goers to download tracks from bands which had played. Although this idea has been dropped in subsequent years, the festival organisers have nurtured an online community through the Download Festival Forums. Initially a sounding board for the fans (and critics) of the festival, the boards have become an integral part of the festival organisation with regular contributions from Festival Director John Probyn and Promoter Andy Copping. The forums also provide face to face feedback through the Fan Forum meetings (started in 2006) and organise the Boardie BBQ (2006 on) and the Boardie Takeover night (2009), football tournaments and a pub quiz for the R.I.P. campers who arrive on a Wednesday night.

When Download began, it took place on the Donington Park circuit infield as had Monsters of Rock. However, in 2008 developments for Formula One meant that the infield was no longer suitable as a festival site. The festival moved to the "Sunday Markets" site to the west of the circuit. Although adequate, numbers were limited and the location of the campsite meant that getting from tents to the arena was quite a hike. 2009 saw the arena move to a much more suitable location to the south of the circuit and has remained there every year since. In 2019 the capacity was 111,000.
Security for the festival has constantly been undertaken by professional crowd management specialists Specialized Security, although the campsite area has had various contractors throughout.

From 2009 to 2019 and returning in 2021, there has been on-site radio broadcasting from Rock Radio on 87.7FM. This RSL broadcast has aired music from festival bands, interviews and news to the festival site and the surrounding area, with the signal reaching as far as Nottingham.

The Download Dog 
The Download Dog is the official mascot of the Download Festival and appears on a wide range of material related to the festival, such as tickets, stage banners, merchandise, marketing, and the official Download website.

Overview

Notes:
DLTV (Download TV) was an online virtual festival that took place on the same days the 2020 Download Festival was due to take place, the event show clips of live performances and interviews from past years and was shown on the Download Festival Youtube and Facebook pages. 
 Download TV returned in 2021 renamed Download Reloaded celebrating the best headliners from the past 10 years, the event was filmed at the Download site in Donington and will be shown on Sky Arts over two nights during 4–5 June.
 The original 2021 event was cancelled due to the ongoing COVID-19 pandemic, however it was announced on 26 May 2021 that Download would take place in 2021 as part in the UK government events research programme to trail large events. The three-day pilot event will have 10,000 fans attending.

2003 

The first Download was held on 31 May – 1 June 2003. The original headliners were Iron Maiden and Limp Bizkit, although the latter pulled out and were replaced by Audioslave. Metallica attempted to step in as headliners, but were unable to do so, owing to headlining that year's Reading and Leeds Festivals. Instead, having performed an exclusive club show in London the night before, they played an unannounced "secret slot" in the afternoon on the second stage, with no soundcheck. "Sunday belonged to Metallica," wrote Mick Middles in Classic Rock. "At 3.15 the band were fired into the heart of the festival. Before me, a nonplussed, earplugged infant was held aloft. Somehow it seemed historical. Debuting selections from St. Anger, Metallica swept into a 90-minute frenzy so irresistible that even the Hells Angels were seen clapping in wholehearted appreciation at the end. The coup was complete."

Chevelle were scheduled to play the Scuzz stage on Sunday but pulled out at the last minute. Instruction, playing their second set of the festival, stepped in as the replacements.

2004

Donington
The 2004 edition of the festival was held on 5–6 June. Another stage was added to the festival, bringing the total to three. Seventy-two bands played over the two days. The 2004 event was also notable for several last minute hitches. First, SOiL got lost on the way to Donington and missed their main stage appearance on Saturday (they later joined Drowning Pool on stage to perform Drowning Pool's "Bodies" and their own song "Halo"). Static-X missed their slot due to a bus breakdown. On Sunday, Slayer arrived on time, but their equipment did not, leading to a slot change from the middle of the afternoon on the main stage to a later slot (and longer set) on the second stage. Slayer were replaced on the main stage by Damageplan, who were scheduled to play the second stage. Their setlist ended with a rendition of Damageplan founders Vinnie Paul and Dimebag Darrell's most recognisable song from Pantera, "Walk."

The biggest news came from the headliners Metallica, when Lars Ulrich was rushed to hospital. Taking to the stage an hour and a half late, James Hetfield explained the situation with Ulrich and the show then began with Slayer drummer Dave Lombardo playing on "Battery" and "The Four Horsemen." Slipknot's Joey Jordison played the rest of the set apart from Fade to Black which was played by Metallica's drum technician, Flemming Larsen.

The full line-up included:

Scotland

In June 2004 a two-day Download Festival was held on Glasgow Green, several days before the Donington event. This had a limited line up with only nine bands performing over a two-day period. The bands which did play included the headliners, Metallica and Linkin Park. Download Scotland also saw an appearance from the Welsh rock band Lostprophets who did not perform at Donington.

Acts which also appeared over the two days at Download Scotland were Korn, Slipknot, Iggy and the Stooges, Machine Head, the Distillers and HIM.

The running order went as follows:

2005 

Download 2005 was held again at Donington Park, on 10–12 June 2005. This festival was different from previous years as the Saturday was officially dubbed Ozzfest 2005, as well as an "Indie day" on the first day of the festival.

Billy Idol performed on the Snickers stage on the Friday night, his first UK gig after a lengthy hiatus, performing songs such as White Wedding, Rebel Yell and a cover version of Van Halen's anthem, Jump.

Feeder's frontman Grant Nicholas was so relieved the band had won the crowd over (there were concerns that they would be received badly by the traditional attendees to the festival), he decided to smash his green Fender Jazzmaster guitar after "Descend" was performed. He later said that he regretted it, but also said he kept the neck and the tremeloes, and might use what was left to make a new guitar. In a July 2010 interview with Kerrang!, it was suggested to Nicholas that he destroyed the guitar as he was frustrated at trying to win the crowd over, as their music was different from the Download demographic, but claimed himself in reply to this that he "Wanted to do the most rock and roll thing after eventually winning over the crowd". In the same interview, Nicholas said that they were "guinea pigs" at the festival as part of the organisers experiment to make it an alternative festival, but said it was a moment of the band's career he is still proud of.

Lemmy also took to the stage, with former MC5 members, and Gilby Clarke, to perform Back in the USA.

Initially, Bert McCracken of the Used and Gerard Way of My Chemical Romance were asked to perform their cover of Under Pressure by Queen and David Bowie, but the former friends refused the offer to perform the cover as they had recently fallen out.

The official line-up included:

2006 

The 2006 Download Festival was held at Donington Park, England on 9–11 June. The headlining acts (Tool, Metallica and Guns N' Roses) have sales of approximately 200–250 million albums between them, more than the entire line up of 2006's V Festival.

2006 was the first time the festival was mirrored in the Republic of Ireland, as Download Festival Ireland.
2006 was also by far the warmest year Download has ever had.

During the festival Korn vocalist Jonathan Davis was rushed to hospital. Similar to 2004's Metallica set, Munky, Fieldy and David Silveria arrived and explained to the fans why Davis could not make it and played with guest vocalists Corey Taylor from Slipknot, Dez Fafara from DevilDriver, Jesse Hasek from 10 Years, Benji Webbe from Skindred, M. Shadows from Avenged Sevenfold, and Matt Heafy from Trivium. Lyrics from the song "Blind" were displayed on the screen for Matt Heafy. Metallica played the album Master of Puppets in its entirety in honour of its twentieth anniversary. Guns N' Roses also performed material from the long forthcoming Chinese Democracy album.

Main Stage
The main stage was situated in the centre of the arena with crowd control moving around it, and was the largest of all three stages, the safety barriers used at this stage were in a T shape so as to avoid crowd crush in the middle. The stage was open-air and named in honour of the 25th anniversary of Kerrang! magazine. Down played an unannounced set on Saturday (With the laminates showing ??? in their time slot); opening up the Main Stage.

Snickers Stage
The Snickers Stage was situated in a tent, behind the main stage and was the second largest stage at the festival. Access to the stage was via a one-way system which attempted to spread people around the site, rather than all attempting to push through a rather small space.

Soilwork were scheduled to play on Sunday, but were replaced by DevilDriver (playing their second set of the festival).

Gibson/Myspace Stage
The Myspace stage was the smallest of the three and under a smaller tent. It was positioned across from the front of the main stage.

Controversy 
During the Sunday headline set of Guns N' Roses, bottles were thrown at the band. This caused problems after the band's lead singer, Axl Rose, slipped on the wet surface and a bottle hit bassist Tommy Stinson. Stinson threw his bass, hitting one of the cameramen, and left the stage. He returned after the song and apologised, but warned the crowd that if this activity continued, he would leave for good. There were some disturbances but they eventually died down, and later in the set Rose commented "I'm actually having quite a good time now! I couldn't have said that an hour ago!"

On the final night, fires were started by some festival goers and police were called, arresting twelve people. At around 4 am, the fire brigade arrived to put out a large fire at the gold campsite. A number of people had taken the railings that had been used to separate the campsite area from the path and used them to barricade the road to prevent the fire engines from reaching the main fire. At this point a number of police assembled in riot gear stormed the campsite. The festival director, John Probyn, posted a message on the official website stating that "About 150 people spoiled the end of what had been a great weekend for over 75,000 of us."

2007 

The 2007 Download Festival took place on 8–10 June 2007.

The three bands that headlined the 2007 festival were My Chemical Romance, Linkin Park and Iron Maiden. Korn's Jonathan Davis stated that the reason for the band returning in 2007 was because of his absence due to illness the previous year. He stated on the official Download Festival website, "I am so looking forward to coming to the Download Festival this year. I was heartbroken to pull out last time. So this time I am very happy to be coming back and we promise to rock the place! I will definitely make-up for missing the last one. You can expect an amazing Korn show!"

Download 2007 was Dimmu Borgir's first ever festival appearance in England. Hardcore Superstar pulled out of their slot on the Tuborg stage on the Sunday because their tour bus broke down in Germany. Download 2007 featured an Indian band Parikrama. They became the first band from India to make it to Donington.

Download 2007 also featured the first band to officially perform on the Thursday of the festival. Scumface played on the Tuborg Stage during the boardie barbecue.

Lamb of God's DVD Walk With Me in Hell features the band's full performance at the festival.

2008 

The 2008 festival took place on 13–15 June. It had a significantly different layout to previous years: the arena area was situated in land to the west of the race track instead of the traditional race track infield area. Among numerous changes, the second stage became larger and moved from a marquee to open-air, on a tarmac car park.

"I am looking forward to humiliating those little boys in little bands who think they count," declared Gene Simmons of Kiss. "We're going to blow their shit to pieces... If U2 or Radiohead are on the bill at Download, then I accept these are good bands. But they will still run for cover when Kiss take the stage, for they are in the presence of a transcendent rock force."

Chris Cornell was scheduled, but cancelled his European tour to focus on a new album. Twin Method, and Finger Eleven were announced but removed from the official website's lineup. On the Friday of the festival, Kid Rock was meant to appear between Seether and Disturbed on the Main Stage but pulled out at the last minute. At first it was announced that this was due to illness. Rock later claimed he left the festival grounds after becoming dissatisfied with the amenities. But, the following year, Download's booker theorised that it had been due to a broken heart. Rock's no-show allowed two bands following him, Disturbed and Judas Priest, to play longer sets.

The 2008 Boardie BBQ took place on the Gibson stage on Thursday 12 June and included a performance by Forever Never.

2009 

The 2009 Download Festival took place on 12–14 June at Donington Park with an estimated attendance of 120,000 over 3 days. The arena had once again changed location, this time to an open field area south of the race track which was more suitable and a shorter walking distance from the camping areas than last year.

The headliners were Faith No More (Friday), Slipknot (Saturday) and Def Leppard (Sunday). Sunday had a strong classic rock themed line-up on the main stage with bands such as Whitesnake, ZZ Top and Journey, somewhat reminiscent of Monsters of Rock. This would become a recurring feature in future years. Other notable performers included Limp Bizkit, who were playing in the UK with their original line-up for the first time since 2001, Trivium returning for their third appearance and first head lining spot, Anvil, the band featured in the 2008 film Anvil! The Story of Anvil, and Steel Panther, who were making their first appearance in the UK on the Tuborg Stage. A fourth stage, the "Red Bull Bedroom Jam Stage", also made an appearance at this year's festival. This stage was also present at other UK festivals, such as T in the Park in Balado, Scotland, and the Underage Festival in Victoria Park, London.

The 2009 Boardie BBQ took place in the Red Bull Bedroom Jam Stage on Thursday 11 June. This year the band was Attica Rage.

The Thursday night of the 2009 festival also saw the Boardie Takeover night. Four bands, three DJ's: Cyst, Dave KC and Gabber Fox, solo singers Hevs and TonsO'Fun, a stand-up and a burlesque dancer – all members of the Download Festival Forums – performed to a full house in the End Tent. These bands were Scumface (returning after a successful appearance at the Boardie BBQ in 2007), Orestea, Echovirus and headliners, Silent Descent.

On Monday 18 May the festival confirmed on its official website that Camping tickets had completely sold out.

On 19 May, it was revealed in an interview with Andy Copping on Music Channel Scuzz that there would be secret sets. It was later revealed the bands would be Enter Shikari and Thunder.

On Wednesday 3 June, one week before the campsite opened, Download released a further 2,500 camping tickets. These limited tickets sold out within 24 hours of being released.

The winners of the "Red Bull Bedroom Jam Competition" was Gravesend-based band After the Ordeal. This set was a 'virtual gig', with the band playing live from their bedroom and this footage being streamed live onto the Main Stage at Download Festival, between Pendulum and Marilyn Manson.

The winners of the "Tuborg Battle of the bands" was Leeds punk band Acid Drop and they opened the Tuborg stage on Saturday 13 June.

The Ghost of a Thousand were scheduled to headline the Red Bull Bedroom Jam Stage on Saturday but the band cancelled. the Blackout stepped in to play their slot, thus giving them two slots on the festival's bill.

Slipknot's performance is available in their new DVD (sic)nesses. It was released on 28 September 2010 and served as a tribute to their late bassist Paul Gray. It was Gray's last UK gig with Slipknot before his death in May 2010.

2010 

The Download Festival was confirmed to return to Donington on the weekend 11–13 June 2010, the campsites opening on 9 June. On 25 January, nine bands were announced at the official Download website, including AC/DC as one of the main stage headliners. On 15 February Rage Against the Machine and Aerosmith were confirmed as the other two main stage headliners, as well as 5 more bands confirmed a few hours later.

Saxon performed their 'Wheels of Steel' album in its entirety to commemorate its 30th anniversary. Download 2010 was also the 30th anniversary of rock festivals at Donington Park, since the first one – which Saxon performed at – in 1980.

It was announced on 16 May that the second stage would be renamed "The Ronnie James Dio Stage" in tribute to the singer who died of stomach cancer on the same day. It was also announced that the main stage would be called the Maurice Jones Stage after the co-founder of Monsters of Rock who also died the previous year.

28 May saw 15 more bands added, and an official announcement of the Jägermeister-sponsored fifth stage, which would host acoustic acts, including bands also performing regular sets at the festival. The initially announced Sum 41 cancelled, owing to drummer Steve Jocz being involved in an accident. On 30 May 2010 it was announced that Wolfmother had to cancel due to illness. They were replaced by Killswitch Engage.

Aside from Dio, the year was sadly memorable for other deaths. Y&T performed the Pepsi Max Stage to a jam-packed audience, marking the band's long-anticipated return to Donington after performing at Monsters of Rock in 1984. Download would be bassist Phil Kennemore's last UK show in the UK: he died from lung cancer six months later. Killing For Company drummer Stuart Cable, previously of Stereophonics, died the week of the festival, at which the band were to play.

Ratt were scheduled to play on Sunday, but cancelled due to illness of vocalist Stephen Pearcy. On 9 June, FM were announced as Ratt's replacement.

The Boardie Takeover ran for the second year in a row on Thursday 10 June. It featured the bands Silent Descent, Fallen Fate, Jacknife Holiday and Cyster Scalpel, as well as singers, DJs and a burlesque dancer.

AC/DC played on an exclusive stage next to the Maurice Jones stage, allowing the band to utilise their full stadium show, as announced on 28 May. This marked the first time a headlining band brought their own stage to Donington. All headlining bands on the other stages had finished before AC/DC began. The stage was used only by AC/DC; the next day, the runway at the front was dismantled and the stage remained empty. "I took my son to see AC/DC..." recalled Saxon's Biff Byford. "Watching Angus from out in the crowd was great, and it was a rite of passage for my son."

The final day saw torrential rain. "By the time Aerosmith take the stage," noted Classic Rock, "we're essentially one amorphous mud blob of an organism blinking through the mire towards the bright lights. They, on the other hand, have Steven Tyler, a man whose dress sense... makes Lady Gaga look like a vicar's wife."

2011 

The Download Festival was confirmed to return to Donington on the 10, 11, and 12 June 2011. Linkin Park and System of a Down were the two main stage headliners officially announced, with Saturday subheadliners Avenged Sevenfold and Sunday second stage headliner Rob Zombie announced a short while later.

On 22 February, Def Leppard were announced as Friday's main stage headliner, with Twisted Sister, Down, Duff McKagan's Loaded and Trash Talk also added to the line-up.

15 March saw the Darkness unveiled as the widely speculated Friday subheadliner, with Funeral for a Friend, Plain White T's, Framing Hanley and Hyro Da Hero also added. In April, the Red Bull Bedroom Jam stage and Jägermeister Acoustic stage's acts were revealed.

Wayne Static was scheduled to open up the main stage on the Sunday, but he pulled out a month prior. Masters of Reality were scheduled to perform but pulled out on 30 March and Karma to Burn were to play the second stage on Sunday but were replaced by Hyro Da Hero, thus giving him three sets over the course of the festival; the most in Download history.

Steward 0836 was manning the main stage at the festival, when he caught the attention of fans waiting for Sunday's bands to appear. Some friendly interaction led to cheers from the audience, then one of the giant stage-screens showed him making the "devil horns" gesture, which was applauded by tens of thousands of rock fans. The official Download Festival website even featured him as an artist on their site.

2012 

On 12 July 2011 it was confirmed via Twitter, and the Download official website that the festival would be staged in 2012 between 8–10 June. Limited early-bird tickets were put on sale on 15 July. It was announced on 10 November via BBC Radio 1 that Metallica would headline the main stage on the Saturday and also that they would be playing their self titled album in its entirety. The next day Black Sabbath were announced to headline the main stage on Sunday 10 June, closing the festival. On 18 November, the Prodigy was announced as the headliner for Friday 8 June.

On 12 April 2012, Download Festival announced on their website, official Facebook page and official Twitter page that the main stage will be named after Jim Marshall who died a week earlier.

Due to the wet and windy conditions on the site, there was a delay in opening the arena on the Friday, resulting in the cancellation/postponement of certain performers.

American heavy metal band Machine Head reportedly broke the festival record for the most circle pits happening during one song, with a reported 29 pits happening at once.

Comedian Bob Slayer, who is a regular on the comedy stage at Download, broke his neck doing a wheelie bin crowd surf stunt whilst entertaining at the festival.

The line-up won an award in the 2012 UK Festival Awards, and festival director John Probyn won a "Lifetime achievement award".

Cancellations

Five Finger Death Punch were scheduled to perform on Sunday on the Main Stage between DevilDriver and Kyuss Lives! but on 5 April they pulled out due to logistical difficulties. Anthrax, who were initially set to play on the Zippo Encore Stage, were brought up to the main stage (later dubbed the Jim Marshall stage) due to Five Finger Death Punch's cancellation.

T. Mills was scheduled to perform on Saturday on the Red Bull stage but pulled out in May and also Porter Robinson, who was also set to play on the same stage on the Friday pulled out due to the recording of a new album. He was replaced by Voodoo Six.

Problems

Due to the wet and windy weather, Download did not open its Arena gates on Friday 8 June until 14:00 whilst laying down straw in the Arena and removing potentially dangerous signs and banners which could prove hazardous in high winds, meaning some of the bands were shifted around. Cancer Bats were moved from second opening band on the Jim Marshall Stage to a headline slot on the Red Bull Bedroom Jam Stage, with Rise to Remain and Six Hour Sundown missing out on a slot entirely. Fear Factory were also given an additional 10 minutes of performance time due Cancer Bats being relocated to a different stage and Rise to Remain being cancelled. Europe were scheduled to play the Zippo Encore stage on Friday before Little Angels, but it was announced at the last minute that they will not be able to perform due to traffic and transportation issues. Much criticism was aimed at the organisers for not preparing better as the poor weather occurred before the festival goers arrived. Also the conditions in the camping and arena meant that many fans who required disabled access were left stuck in the mud requiring help from their fellow fans to reach their destination, or even the toilets, often with little to no help from organisers.

2013 
The eleventh annual Download festival was confirmed for 14–16 June 2013. Early bird tickets went on sale 15 June 2012, where a newly implemented deposit scheme was introduced; which allowed customers to pay for their ticket(s) over three payments rather than one. Iron Maiden were announced as the Saturday headliner on 20 September 2012 to commemorate 25 Years since first appearing and headlining Monsters of Rock in 1988 on Seventh Tour of a Seventh Tour . Rammstein let slip on the same day that they will be headlining Download on the Sunday, which was confirmed by the festival organisers the following morning. Seven days later it was confirmed via Andy Copping (festival promoter) that Slipknot would be the Friday headliner. From 5 November, bands started to be announced sporadically via Facebook, Scuzz TV, BBC Radio 1, Kerrang! Magazine and the personal Twitter account of Andy Copping.

Goldsboro were due to be playing at the festival, but on 19 February they confirmed they would not be able to perform. After the Burial were scheduled to perform on the Red Bull Studios stage, but pulled out on 17 May in order to focus on their new album.

On 28 May, Skin and Red, White & Blues cancelled their appearances at the festival. Both acts were to perform twice over the weekend, on the Zippo Encore and Jägermeister Acoustic stages. On 3 June, Andy Copping confirmed that Buckcherry would be pulling out of the festival and that they would be replaced by Black Star Riders.

2014 

The twelfth annual festival was held 13–15 June 2014. Earlybird tickets went on sale 21 June 2013. Between 4–6 November, all three main stage headliners were confirmed, along with all the sub-headliners. Linkin Park performed their debut album, Hybrid Theory album in its entirety.

Reactions to Avenged Sevenfold being announced as headliners were very mixed. After a Facebook user suggested that Dying Fetus headline the festival instead, a social media trend titled #WhyNotDyingFetus was started as a joke. However, this actually led to the band being booked to play, although not in a headline slot, and they were officially confirmed on 6 November.

To commemorate its 20th anniversary, the Offspring performed their third studio album, Smash, in its entirety. Also, their appearance marked the first time in Download history that a previous main stage headliner returned to play a lower slot (though Limp Bizkit, who were originally scheduled to headline the festival in 2003 would return in 2009 to play a lower slot).

Andy Copping confirmed via Twitter that there would be a Secret Set on the Pepsi Max Stage on the Sunday, performing in the time slot in between Crazy Town and Memphis May Fire. This transpired to be Black Stone Cherry.

On 23 May, the Main stage was renamed the Stephen Sutton stage after Stephen Sutton who died on 14 May.

The Boardie Takeover returned on Thursday 12 June and featured four bands and 2 DJs. The bands playing the Takeover are: Last Edition, Scumface, Dumbjaw & Incinery.

Joe Bonamassa was originally booked to play on the Zippo Encore Stage Saturday before Status Quo but he was moved to the Sunday Main Stage due to a double booking. Trivium were initially confirmed to be headlining the Red Bull Studios Live stage on the Sunday, but following a generally negative response from fans due to the size and limited capacity of the tent, the band was moved to Zippo Encore Stage headliner.

In Flames were scheduled to sub-headline the Zippo Encore stage on Sunday, but they were quietly removed from the line-up poster on 26 February. It was later revealed that they had cancelled all of their Summer shows to finish recording their new album. On 22 March the latest announcement was leaked by Classic Rock Magazine. Shortly after the leak, Defeater, who were scheduled to play on the Pepsi Max Stage Sunday, were confirmed to have pulled out due to their lead singer, Derek Archambault, suffering an injury and having to undergo hip replacement surgery. Danger Danger were originally confirmed, but pulled out on 7 April, claiming that bookings had been erroneously made for various dates. September Mourning were confirmed for the Pepsi Max Stage on the Friday but were removed from the lineup on 2 May (as they wished to focus on getting their sophomore album completed), they were replaced by I Am Fire. Cage the Gods also pulled out on 2 May. King 810 pulled out the day before they were due to play because their lead vocalist and bassist were arrested. Upon a Burning Body were scheduled to appear on the Pepsi Max stage on Saturday, but were forced to pull out because singer Danny Leal was taken seriously ill with an inner ear infection that meant doctors would not clear him to fly to the UK.

The unknown band 'Iceman Thesis' were subtly added to the lineup poster in the buildup to the event. They were scheduled to perform for five minutes on both the Pepsi Max and Red Bull Studios Live Stage on the Saturday at the same time. The band performed both sets as scheduled with all ten (two bands of five) member's identities hidden using balaclavas. They performed one song known as 'Return to Harmony' before leaving the stages.

2015 

The 2015 edition of the festival took place on 12–14 June. The top three acts on the main stage and the second stage headliner for each day were announced over 18, 19 and 20 November. Bad weather on Friday night and Saturday left the Arena, Village and campsites extremely muddy. Many tents were abandoned over night due to flooding and leaks.

On 22 March 2015, the Download Dog made an appearance at a Progress Wrestling show in London. The Dog invited the entire roster to do a show at Download 2015 but excluded the current Progress Champion Jimmy Havoc. Havoc attacked the Dog at the show. It was confirmed that Progress would do a show at Download after previously in 2014 doing three shows at the Sonisphere Festival.

Following on from the Offspring's second stage appearance in 2014, Faith No More's subheadlining position marks the second time a previous main stage headliner have returned to play in a lower slot. Mötley Crüe's performance was their last ever UK festival appearance.

Several bands who pulled out of the 2014's festival returned to play in 2015, these bands include In Flames, Defeater, Upon a Burning Body & September Mourning.

The Sword were due to play on the Maverick Stage on Friday, but were removed from the line-up poster in March, later being confirmed to have pulled out. King 810 were due to play the Maverick Stage on Sunday, but pulled out on 15 May due to undisclosed reasons, just as they had done before in 2014. On 22 May, Ghost Town, who were confirmed to play on Jake's stage on Saturday, pulled out due to undisclosed reasons; they were replaced by Dub War. Antemasque were due to play on the Zippo Encore Stage on Friday, but pulled out in May, the Cadillac Three were moved up from Jake's Stage to replace them.

After many weeks of discussion surrounding the identities of two secret bands playing over the weekend, Young Guns and the Darkness were confirmed on 8 June. Babymetal also joined DragonForce on stage to perform their song "Gimme Chocolate!!".

The Jägermeister Acoustic Stage will no longer be present at the festival, due to Jägermeister pulling out as a sponsor, however, bands will still perform acoustic sets, on the brand new Dog's Bed Stage. Hands Like Houses were scheduled to perform there on Friday, but the show was cancelled.

Returning for its 7th year, the Boardie Takeover took place on the Thursday night in the Doghouse Tent located within the festivals Village area.  This year's bands were selected by the Takeover team, Hevs and Phil

Police surveillance and marketing profile collection 
At the 2015 festival, the police and the festival organizers engaged in massive technological surveillance of those who attended the festival. RFID wristband and facial recognition technology were used, installed by the Leicestershire Police without notifying the public prior to the event, and compared visual scans of the festival attendees against a European criminal database. RFID wristbands were the only way to make purchases or travel across the festival grounds' zones. Information about purchases were stored and sold to other marketers. Muse frontman Matt Bellamy commented on the surveillance during the band's performance of "Uprising", in which he said "Fuck Leicestershire police for scanning your faces!"

2016

Donington
The 14th annual Download Festival was held on 10–12 June 2016. All three headliners were confirmed between 19–21 October 2015 and it was confirmed that Bruce Dickinson was due to fly his Ed Force One 747-400 Jumbo Jet across Download to get to the festival. However, this didn't happen, and in fact Ed Force One flew into East Midlands airport from the opposite direction. Motörhead were due to play the Main Stage on the Friday of the festival; however, due to the death of lead singer Lemmy Kilmister on 28 December 2015, the band would no longer be playing, as confirmed by drummer Mikkey Dee. On 7 February 2016, 36 more bands were added to the bill, as well as the announcement that the Main Stage would be renamed "The Lemmy Stage" in memory of Kilmister, instead of having a band replace Motörhead, it was confirmed that there would be a tribute to Lemmy, which was confirmed at the fan forum to be a 20-minute video.

Heavy rain caused the venue to flood, with some campsites suffering worse than others. The Met Office later confirmed that it could have been the wettest in the festival's history. By Saturday, The Village area was mainly mud with a bit of straw laid down near the entrance to the Blue Campsite. This led to great difficulty trying to get to the main arena, as one had to walk through thick mud most of the way. Architects was scheduled to play on the Encore stage on 11 June but had dropped all of their European festival tours due to a family emergency and were replaced by Against the Current.

Both Moses and Ghost were also forced to pull out of their scheduled sets on Friday and Sunday respectively due to illness on both counts.

As confirmed by The Mirror, NXT also appeared at this years event, although where Progress Wrestling was after the bands in the campsite, WWE NXT was in the main arena, with a special stage constructed. During the event, the companies' COO and founder of NXT Triple H was awarded by Dave Mustaine the Spirit of Lemmy Award due to their friendship and working relationship.

France
In addition to the annual UK edition of Download Festival, it was also announced that in 2016 there would also be a Download held at the Longchamp Racecourse in Paris on the same weekend as the UK Festival. The lineup will be similar to the UK Festival, but not identical. Iron Maiden were announced as the Friday headliner on 19 October 2015, part of their The Book Of Souls Tour. Rammstein were announced as Sunday headliners on 21 October 2015.

2017

The 15th annual event took place on 9–11 June 2017. From 3 November 2016, band announcements began, including the headline acts in System of a Down, Biffy Clyro and Aerosmith.

Donington

France
Returning for its second year, Download Festival France takes place just south of Paris the same weekend as the Donington event. So far five bands have been announced including headliners System Of A Down, Linkin Park, and Green Day the lineup reads as follows:

Spain
Download Festival Madrid is a brand new member of the rock and metal festival family, taking place in the Spanish capital. After hosting a Parisian edition of the festival for the first time last year, the iconic festival spreads its reach even further in 2017, establishing a new outpost in Madrid.

2018

The 2018 event has been confirmed for the weekend of 8, 9 & 10 June 2018. On 6 November Ozzy Osbourne was announced as the first headliner, with Avenged Sevenfold and Guns N' Roses being announced on 8 and 10 November.

Donington

Australia

It has been confirmed that Live Nation, Unified and Secret Sounds will take the UK-founded rock festival to Melbourne's Flemington Racecourse on Saturday 24 March 2018. This will be a one-day event and the line-up is to be announced on Thursday 9 November.

France

Returning for its third year, Download Festival France takes place in Brétigny-sur-Orge just south of Paris the weekend after the Donington event (15th, 16, 17 & 18 June). Headliners were Ozzy Osbourne, Marilyn Manson, Guns N' Roses & Foo Fighters. Originally, Black Veil Brides was supposed to play on 15 June but pulled out the festival to join the Vans Warped Tour back in America.

Spain

Returning for its second year, Download Festival Spain takes place just south of Madrid three weekends after the Donington event (28, 29 & 30 June).

2019

Donington

The 2019 event took place during 14–16 June. The first 20 bands, including all three main stage headliners, were announced at 2pm on 23 October 2018. More bands were announced on 27 January 2019. In terms of genres, 44 artists represented rock (out of 117), while 41 bands played metal music.

Now three-time headliner Def Leppard played their seminal album Hysteria in full as part of their set.

Some people left the festival before any of the bands had even started playing due to heavy rain turning the site into a "mud-bath". Several festival goers injured themselves due to falling over because of the conditions.

Australia
The 2019 event was held in Sydney on 9 March and in Melbourne on 11 March.
Ozzy Osbourne was announced as the headliner of the festival, but cancelled due to his illness, pneumonia.

Japan

The Live Nation and Creativeman Productions took place at the UK-founded rock festival to Makuhari Messe, located in Chiba, on Thursday, 21 March 2019. This was a one-day event.
Ozzy Osbourne was announced as the headliner of the festival, but cancelled due to his illness, pneumonia.

Spain

2020
The 2020 Download events were due to be held in the UK, Australia and Japan. They were all cancelled due to the COVID-19 pandemic. A return of the Paris edition was also planned but was cancelled in September 2019 due to construction work on the festival site by French transportation company SNCF.

Donington
The 2020 event was scheduled to take place during 12–14 June. The initial lineup was announced on 23 September 2019, with Kiss, Iron Maiden and System of a Down to headline. On 26 March 2020, due to the COVID-19 pandemic in the United Kingdom, it was announced that the 2020 event had been cancelled.

The 2020 festival was replaced by Download TV, a 3 day virtual festival showing old performances, unseen interviews, new performances and more. The online festival started on the same day the festival was due to take place.

Australia
The 2020 event was scheduled to take place in Melbourne on 20 March and in Sydney on 21 March. However, due to headliners My Chemical Romance withdrawing from the festival due to fears regarding the pandemic, and the organisers unable to secure a replacement headline act in such a short time, Download Australia 2020 was cancelled. The other headliners were to be Deftones and Jimmy Eat World.

Japan
The 2020 event was scheduled to take place in Chiba City on 29 March, headlined by My Chemical Romance.

2021
For 2021, only a UK Download event was scheduled to take place from 4 to 6 June. The dates for the 2021 Download event in the UK were announced on 3 June 2020. The announcement revealed that two headliners, KISS and System of a Down, as well as many other acts, would be returning to the festival after its cancellation in 2020. As was the case with the previous year, the 2021 event was cancelled on 1 March 2021, due to the COVID-19 pandemic in the United Kingdom.

The 2021 event was replaced with another virtual event similar to 2020. It was announced on 14 May 2021 that there would be two special programmes on Sky Arts on 5 and 6 June featuring the best headliners from the past 10 years of Download.

As part of the second phase of the UK Government's Event Research Programme, a pilot testing event of Download Festival 2021 was announced on 26 May 2021 called Download Festival Pilot. The event was held from 18 June to 20 June with an all-British lineup headlined by Frank Carter & the Rattlesnakes, Enter Shikari and Bullet For My Valentine. The main stage on the Sunday experienced a few sound issues, notable during Loathe's set which saw them lose their sound during the final song of their set, and The Wildhearts who ended their set early and left the stage.

2022
The 2022 UK Download event took place from 10 to 12 June.

Donington

The dates for the 2022 Download event in the UK were announced on 1 March 2021, with Kiss, Iron Maiden and Biffy Clyro set to headline. Wednesday 13 pulled out a few weeks before due to bicep surgery.

On Saturday 11 June, East Midlands Airport was forced to close its runway for a short time due to drones being in the vicinity, which were reported by Leicestershire Police and the Festival as being flown by guests at the festival.

Germany

Japan

2023

The 2023 event is scheduled to take place from Thursday 8 June to Sunday 11 June. As a celebration for the twentieth anniversary of the festival, a four night event was announced. 

On 7 November over sixty artists were announced to perform at the festival; including headliners Bring Me the Horizon, Slipknot and two unique sets from Metallica

Donington

Germany

See also
 
List of Festivals at Donington Park
List of historic rock festivals
Love Not Riots

References

External links 

 

Heavy metal festivals in the United Kingdom
Rock festivals in England
Annual events in the United Kingdom
Music festivals in Leicestershire
Music festivals established in 2003
Rock festivals in Australia